Frank Mercovich (19 February 1898 – 12 October 1967) was a former Australian rules footballer who played with Carlton in the Victorian Football League (VFL).

Notes

External links 
		
Frank Mercovich's profile at Blueseum

1898 births
1967 deaths
Australian rules footballers from Victoria (Australia)
Carlton Football Club players